Robert Odell (May 4, 1896 – February 20, 1984) was an American art director. He was nominated an Academy Award in the category Best Art Direction for the film Beau Geste.

Selected filmography
 Beau Geste (1939)

References

External links

1896 births
1984 deaths
American art directors
People from Los Angeles